Trilepisium gymnandrum is a species of Trilepisium that is endemic to the Seychelles, where it is threatened by habitat loss.  Its natural habitat is subtropical or tropical moist lowland forests. Five mature individuals are known in two sub-populations in the mid to high altitude forests of Silhouette Island. The 18th century populations of the larger Mahé and Praslin islands have presumably been extirpated.

The NPTS has established a new population on Silhouette island.

See also
 Ficus bojeri (Moraceae) – Seychelles endemic

References

Trees of Seychelles
gymnandrum
Critically endangered plants
Endemic flora of Seychelles
Taxonomy articles created by Polbot